Weston Underwood may refer to:

Weston Underwood, Buckinghamshire, England
Weston Underwood, Derbyshire, England